María Zavala Valladares (born January 15, 1956) is a Peruvian politician, lawyer and judge. She was the Minister for Justice.

Biography
Zavala Valladares was born in Talara on 15 January 1956. Zavala Valladares has been President of the Superior Courts of Lima and Loreto. She was appointed Minister of Justice of Peru in 2006 when she became a member of Alan García's first cabinet. The next Minister of Justice was Rosario Fernández who took over the role in 2008.

On January 3, 2008 Zavala Valladares became Peru's Permanent Representative to the Organization of American States (OAS), replacing Antero Florez Araoz. She served until 2010.

In 2010 Zavala was serving as part of a Truth Commission to investigate the fall of power of Manuel Zelaya in Honduras.

References

1956 births
Living people
20th-century Peruvian judges
Peruvian politicians
People from Talara
21st-century Peruvian women politicians
21st-century Peruvian politicians
Female justice ministers
20th-century Peruvian lawyers